La Boîte à sel (English: The Salt Box) is a French satirical comedy and current affairs television program created and presented by Jacques Grello, Robert Rocca and Pierre Tchernia that aired on RTF (French Radio and Television Broadcasting) from October 16, 1955, to November 5, 1960.

Several famous French actors and comics participated on the show such as Michel Roux. Paul Préboist or the actress Dora Doll.

History 
La Boîte à sel was the first satirical television show in France. The show caused controversy as the producers refused to censor jokes about the Algerian War thus ending the program.

References

External links 

1955 French television series debuts
1960 French television series endings
1950s French television series
1960s French television series
1950s satirical television series
French-language television shows